Muhlenberg County is a county in the U.S. Commonwealth of Kentucky. As of the 2020 census, the population was 30,928. Its county seat is Greenville and its largest city is Central City.

History
Muhlenberg County was formed in 1798 from the areas known as Logan and Christian counties. Muhlenberg was the 34th county to be founded in Kentucky. Muhlenberg was named after General Peter Muhlenberg, who was a colonial general during the American Revolutionary War.

Geography

Features
The two primary aquatic features of Muhlenberg County are the Green River and Lake Malone. The northern area of the county's geography includes gently rolling hills, river flatlands, and some sizeable bald cypress swamps along Cypress Creek and its tributaries. The southern portion consists of rolling hills with higher relief. The southern part of the county is dotted with deep gorges. This area is known for many sandstone formations. Several north-south-oriented faults cross the county's midpoint. Coal is found in these faults, across the county's central part. Most remaining deposits reside deep underground; previous near-surface deposits have now been exhausted by strip mining. In former years, it was common to see machines such as the "Big Brother" Power Shovel (pictured on the right) throughout the county. During the 1970s and early 1980s, Muhlenberg County was the state leader in coal production and sometimes the top coal producer in the United States. Strip mining was criticized in the song "Paradise" by John Prine.

Sandstone is the county's most abundant rock type, although limestone becomes more common toward the southern area of the county. Two mines for extracting iron ore have been attempted, at Old Airdrie on the banks of the Green River, and at Buckner Furnace south of Greenville, Kentucky. Both iron ore mines were extant in the late 19th century and early 20th century; neither were successful.

Green River
The -long Green River is a tributary of the Ohio River. It provides a commercial outlet for goods (primarily coal) to be shipped from the county to the major trade centers along the Mississippi River.

Lake Malone
Lake Malone is in southern Muhlenberg County near Dunmor. It, and a portion of the surrounding hardwood forest, form Lake Malone State Park, maintained by the Kentucky Department of Fish and Wildlife. The lake's surface extends into two neighboring counties, Todd and Logan. There are sandstone cliffs and natural sandstone formations along the lake shore including a natural bridge, although the bridge itself is not inside the park boundary.

Adjacent counties
 McLean County  (north)
 Ohio County  (northeast)
 Butler County  (east)
 Logan County  (southeast)
 Todd County  (south)
 Christian County  (southwest)
 Hopkins County  (west)

Demographics

As of the census of 2010, there were 31,499 people, 12,979 households, and 9,057 families residing in the county. The racial makeup of the county was 94.19% White, 4.65% Black or African American, 0.13% Native American, 0.13% Asian, 0.19% from other races, and 0.72% from two or more races. 0.73% of the population were Hispanic or Latino of any race. The median income for a household in the county was $28,566. 15.50% of families and 19.70% of the population was below the poverty line, including 26.00% of those under age 18 and 17.00% of those age 65 or over.

Economy

Muhlenberg County has been a major coal-producing region for the United States for many years; during most of the 1970s, Muhlenberg County annually produced more coal than anywhere else in the country. Although coal mining in the county waned in the late 1980s and early 1990s, as the 21st century began, the coal-mining industry in Muhlenberg and surrounding counties began to expand and has once again provided a significant number of jobs in the region. One reason for this is the willingness of utility operators to install flue gas cleaning systems so that bituminous coal can be burned with fewer airborne contaminants. Another reason is that most coal from the western US has a lower BTU content.

Muhlenberg County held Kentucky's first commercial coal mine, opened in 1820 as the "McLean Drift Bank" along the Green River in the former village of Paradise. The mine and its impact on the community are referenced in the John Prine song "Paradise". Other major employers in Muhlenberg County include:
 The Tennessee Valley Authority Paradise Combined Cycle Plant in Drakesboro
 The Green River Correctional Complex in Central City
 Dyno Nobel in Graham
 EBA&D in Graham
 Muhlenberg Community Hospital in Greenville
 Muhlenberg County Board of Education in Powderly
 Kentucky National Guard Wendell H. Ford Regional Training Center & Kentucky UTES
 Armstrong Coal Company in Central City
 Ken-American Resources: Paradise Underground Mine in Central City
 Kentucky Utilities Green River Generating Station in Central City
 Wal-Mart in Central City.
 Uncle Lee's / Wing Supply in Greenville, Kentucky
 Gourmet Express in Greenville

Chamber of commerce
In January 2006, the chambers of commerce from Central City and Greenville merged to form the Greater Muhlenberg Chamber of Commerce representing over 155 local businesses.

Incoming industries
Peabody Energy's proposed Thoroughbred Energy Plant, a coal-burning power generation facility expected to bring 450 permanent jobs to the area, was to be located in Central City. The plant was projected to begin electricity generation in 2007, but a dispute over Peabody's air quality permit halted construction plans. The power plant plans have now been scrapped, as was a later partnership between Peabody Energy and ConocoPhillips Oil Company called "Kentucky NewGas".

Education

Schools
Public schools in Muhlenberg County are operated by the Muhlenberg County Board of Education. They include:

Elementary (K-5)
 Bremen Elementary School in Bremen
 Central City Elementary School in Central City
 Greenville Elementary School in Greenville
 Longest Elementary School in Powderly
 Muhlenberg South Elementary School in Beechmont

Middle (6-8)
 Muhlenberg North Middle School in Powderly
 Muhlenberg South Middle School in Greenville

High (9-12)
 Muhlenberg County High School in Greenville.

Postsecondary
 Muhlenberg Campus of Madisonville Community College (Central City)
 Muhlenberg Career Development Center (between Central City & Greenville)

Former schools
 Drakesboro Elementary School in Drakesboro (closed in 2006)
 Graham Elementary School in Graham (closed in 2004)
 Hughes-Kirkpatrick Elementary School in Beechmont (closed in 2006)
 Lake Malone Elementary School in Dunmor (closed in 2005)
 Muhlenberg North High School (closed in 2009)
 Muhlenberg South High School (closed in 2009)

Libraries
 Harbin Memorial Library in Greenville is a public library, with free access to high-speed internet
 Central City Library in Central City is a public library, with free access to high-speed internet.

These libraries are operated as Muhlenberg County Public Libraries.

Thistle Cottage Genealogy and History Annex in Greenville also operates under the umbrella of Muhlenberg County Public Libraries as a museum and history archive.

History of education
At one time the county hosted eight secondary schools. Drakesboro Community closed after the class of 1964 graduated and in 1990, the school board consolidated the middle and high school students into two middle and two high schools. Bremen High School, Central City High School, Graham High School, and half of Muhlenberg Central High School became Muhlenberg North Middle School and Muhlenberg North High School, while the other half of Muhlenberg Central High School, Drakesboro High School, Hughes-Kirkpatrick High School, Greenville High School, and Lake Malone School (which housed some middle school students) became Muhlenberg South Middle School and Muhlenberg South High School. The eight distinct schools continued to house elementary school students.

In 2004, the school board began consolidating the elementary schools, closing Graham Elementary School and transferring students to Longest Elementary Greenville Elementary Schools; closing Lake Malone School and transferring students to Hughes-Kirkpatrick Elementary School. In 2005 Drakesboro Elementary School was closed, with students first attending Hughes-Kirkpatrick Elementary and then Muhlenberg South Elementary School (2006). Hughes-Kirkpatrick was later closed.

Muhlenberg North and Muhlenberg South High Schools were merged into a single Muhlenberg County High School in June 2009.

Media
 WMTA AM 1380 Radio (1955) Central City
 WNES AM 1050 Radio (1955) Central City
 Times Argus (1909) Central City
 Leader-News established in Greenville, now located in Central City
 SurfKY News (2008). Based in Madisonville, this online news service serves Muhlenberg County and surrounding counties.
 WKYA FM 105.5 Radio Greenville
 WEKV FM 101.9 Radio studio in Central City, transmitter at Pleasant Ridge, Kentucky in Ohio County

Sites of interest
 Lake Malone State Park in Dunmor
 Muhlenberg County Rail to Trails,  converted railroad track between Central City and Greenville
 Brewco Motorsports shop in Central City
 Thistle Cottage, a museum and art gallery in Greenville (now part of Muhlenberg County Public Libraries)
 Four Legends Fountain in Drakesboro
 Muhlenberg County Agriculture and Convention Center in Powderly
 Morgan Memorial Park in Greenville
 The Muhlenberg County Park, a sports facility adjacent to the Muhlenberg County High School west campus in Greenville
 The Brizendine Brothers Nature Park in Greenville
 Luzerne Lake City Park in Greenville
 Paradise Park in Powderly, includes:
 Coal Mines Shotgun House
 Merle Travis Birthplace
 Paradise Park Museum
 Springridge School
 Tennessee Valley Authority Paradise Fossil Plant in Drakesboro, one of the nation's largest Coal-Fired Power Plants. Site includes:
 Public Boat Launch Ramp along the Green River
 Public Fishing Lakes
 Historic Village of Paradise Cemetery, the only remnant of the village along the Green River.
Central City Convention Center, Fitness Facility and Outdoor Pool & Spray Park in Central City
 Muhlenberg County Courthouse (1907) in Greenville
 Muhlenberg County Veterans Mall and Plaza in Greenville
 Lt. Ephraim Brank Memorial & Trail, at Greenville's Veteran's Mall
 The Pillars of Community have enhanced the beauty of downtown Greenville by adding "Art to Restoration". The locations include:
 FAITH – United Methodist Church on North Main Street
 FAMILY – Across from the MCTI Theater on North Main Street
 ENTERPRISE – Between Edward Jones Investments & 1st KY Bank
 PATRIOTISM – At the United States Post Office on Courts Street
 EDUCATION – In front of Greenville Elementary School on East Main Cross
 ARTS – In front of Thistle Cottage on Cherry Street
 HEALTH – In front of Muhlenberg Community Hospital
 TEAMWORK – At Martin Ground along East Main Cross
 Historic Gristmill Stone, adjacent to the Veterans Mall at the Muhlenberg County Courthouse
 The Summerhouse, a gazebo in Greenville

Annual events
 Rods and Ribs BBQ Festival in Central City the first Saturday in June
 Labor Day Cruise-In in Central City
 Saturdays on the Square - summers in Greenville
 Squash & Gobble arts bazaar and fall festival - Greenville
 The "Clodhopper" Vintage Tractor Show - Greenville.

Politics

Communities

Cities

 Bremen
 Central City
 Drakesboro
 Greenville (county seat)
 Powderly
 South Carrollton

Census-designated places

 Beechmont
 Dunmor (partly in Logan County)

Unincorporated communities

 Beech Creek
 Belton
 Bevier
 Browder
 Cleaton
 Depoy
 Ennis
 Frogtown
 Gishton
 Graham
 Gus
 Luzerne
 Millport
 Moorman
 Nelson
 Nonell
 Penrod
 Rosewood
 Weir

Ghost towns
 Airdrie
 Lewisburg
 Paradise

Notable people
 James Best (Sheriff Rosco P. Coltrane of the Dukes of Hazzard), born in Powderly
 Don Everly of The Everly Brothers singing duo, born in now-defunct Brownie, near Central City
 Harpe Brothers, Micajah and Wiley, America's first known serial-killers
 Kennedy Jones, guitarist
 Warren Oates, actor, born in Depoy near Greenville
 Merle Travis, western musician, born in Rosewood
 Roger Newman, University of Kentucky men's basketball player, born in Greenville 
 Benjamin Tod (Lost Dog Street Band), singer and songwriter
 John Prine wrote the song Paradise from his first self-titled album about growing up in Muhlenberg County in the now defunct mining town of Paradise. The song has become a folk music staple since then.

See also

 National Register of Historic Places listings in Muhlenberg County, Kentucky

References

External links
 Muhlenberg County Schools
 Muhlenberg County Public Libraries
 Greater Muhlenberg Chamber of Commerce
 Photos of the damage path caused by the 2008 Super Tuesday tornado outbreak

 
Kentucky counties
1798 establishments in Kentucky
Populated places established in 1798